North Star High School is a public High School, located in northern Somerset County, and is named after the former North Star Way (now Flight 93 Memorial Highway) that travels through the district. North Star is a merger of the Jenner-Boswell and Forbes School District in 1969.

Vocational Education
Students in grades 10–12, who wish to pursue training in a specific career path or field may attend the Somerset County Technology Center in Somerset Township.

Athletics
North Star participates in PIAA District V:

 Baseball - Class AA
 Basketball - Class AA
 Football - Class AA
 Golf - Class AAAA
 Rifle - Class AAAA
 Soccer - Class A/AA
 Softball - Class AA
 Volleyball - Class A
 Wrestling - Class AA

References

Public high schools in Pennsylvania
Schools in Somerset County, Pennsylvania
1969 establishments in Pennsylvania